Eugenia palumbis (Chamorro: agatelang) is a shrub in the family Myrtaceae endemic to Guam and the Commonwealth of the Northern Mariana Islands.

References 

	

palumbis
Flora of the Mariana Islands